Nizhnyaya Medveditsa is a rural locality in Nizhnemedveditsky Selsoviet Rural Settlement, Kursky District, Kursk Oblast, Russia. Population:

Geography 
The village is located in the Bolshaya Kuritsa River basin (a right tributary of the Seym River), 96 km from the Russia–Ukraine border, 16 km north-west of Kursk, 2 km from the selsoviet center – Verkhnyaya Medveditsa.

 Climate
Nizhnyaya Medveditsa has a warm-summer humid continental climate (Dfb in the Köppen climate classification).

Transport 
Nizhnyaya Medveditsa is located 0.5 km from the federal route  Crimea Highway (a part of the European route ), 14 km from the nearest railway halt Bukreyevka (railway line Oryol – Kursk).

The rural locality is situated 19 km from Kursk Vostochny Airport, 139 km from Belgorod International Airport and 217 km from Voronezh Peter the Great Airport.

References

Notes

Sources

Rural localities in Kursky District, Kursk Oblast